Canadian federal elections have provided the following results in Western Montreal.

Regional Profile
Montreal boasts some of the most highly polarized political geography in Canada. While the sovereigntist Bloc Québécois dominated the mostly francophone East End for 20 years, the largely anglophone and Jewish western portions of the city have been a Liberal and federalist fortress for over six decades, being to the Liberals what rural Alberta is to the Conservatives.  The region is home to some of the safest Liberal ridings in the nation (e.g. Mount Royal and Saint-Laurent—Cartierville). Even in the surge of support for Brian Mulroney in Quebec in 1984 and 1988, the Liberals took the most seats in this region.  This continued amid the Liberal meltdown in Quebec in 2006, although one seat at the eastern end of the area was lost to the Bloc. Before 2011, 1984 was the only election in recent memory in which traditional Liberal dominance was seriously threatened in this region.  Two former Prime Ministers, Paul Martin and Pierre Trudeau, represented ridings in this area.

Nevertheless, in 2011, several Liberal bastions, such as Notre-Dame-de-Grâce—Lachine, LaSalle—Émard (Martin's former riding), and Pierrefonds—Dollard, fell to the New Democratic surge felt throughout Quebec.  Additionally, the Conservatives came very close to taking Mount Royal (Trudeau's former riding), which has been in Liberal hands since 1940.  Ultimately, the NDP took five of the region's nine seats, with the Liberals holding the remainder.  The region reverted to form in 2015, with the Liberals taking every seat here except Outremont, the riding of NDP leader Tom Mulcair.

The West End returned to a Liberal sweep when Mulcair resigned and the Liberals seized Outremont in the ensuing by-election. In 2019, the Liberals dominated the region, taking every riding by 11,000 votes or more.

Votes by party throughout time

2019 - 43nd General Election

2015 - 42nd General Election

2011 - 41st General Election

2008 - 40th General Election

2006 - 39th General Election

2004 - 38th General Election

Maps 

Jeanne-Le Ber
Lac-Saint-Louis
LaSalle-Émard
Mount Royal
Notre-Dame-de-Grâce-Lachine
Outremont
Pierrefonds-Dollard
Saint-Laurent-Cartierville
Westmount-Ville-Marie

2000 - 37th General Election

1997 - 36th General Election

1993 - 35th General Election

Seats won/lost by party

Results by riding

1988 - 34th General Election

Results by riding 

Canadian federal election results in Quebec
Politics of Montreal